Bablake School is a co-educational private day school located in Coventry, England and founded in 1344 by Isabella of France, widow of Edward II, making it one of the oldest schools in the United Kingdom. It is a part of the Coventry School Foundation, a registered charity, along with King Henry VIII School, King Henry VIII Preparatory School and Cheshunt School. As of January 2021, Bablake is a selective, fee-charging independent school and a member of the HMC.

History

Started by Edward II's widow Queen Isabella in 1344, Bablake (or Babbelak in Middle English) was a public school first sited at Hill Street in  Coventry. Isabella endowed the Guild of St John with the Babbelak land on which was founded the St John's chapel and the Bablake school linked to it. Bablake church, now known as St John's, still stands adjacent to the school's original buildings. The school still holds concerts in the church, and has even sung Evensong there once. Many of the pupils were originally choristers of the church. The relationship continued through the figure of Edward Jackson, who from 1734 was both vicar of the church and headmaster of the school. The expansion of the Bablake site continued via land grants. In the 1890s, Bablake began to move to its current site in Coundon Road, where it continued as a public school with six all-boys boarding houses.

In the 1930s fifty acres of land on Hollyfast Road were purchased to expand the playing fields of the school. During the Second World War, the school was evacuated to Lincoln. In 1975 the first female pupil was admitted. The school had long ceased taking boarders; what had been the bedrooms became the Mathematics department, and the headmaster's house became the Geography department. In the late 1980s the school built its Modern Languages block; a few years later Bablake Junior School opened and in 2000 the English, Drama and Music block was completed, sited on what was originally the headmaster's garden.

In October 2020, it was announced that Bablake would merge with King Henry VIII School. The proposed new school was initially named Coventry School, before backlash from parents and staff led to Bablake and King Henry VIII School being chosen. The combined school was set to open in September 2021. In June 2022, Governors agreed to return to the original name, Bablake School.

List of headmasters

Rev. Edward Jackson (1734–1758)
Sir William Moore (1822–1824)
Dr. Henry Mander (1824–1870)
F.W. Humberstone MA (1870–1890)
Rev. Dr. Franklyn (?–?)
E.A. Seaborne MA (1937–1962)
E.H. Burrough MA (1962–1977)
Martin W. Barker MA (1977–1991)
Dr. Stuart Nuttall (1991–2006)
John W. Watson MA (2006–2019)
Andrew M. Wright BSc (2019–2021)
Chris R. Seeley MPhil (2021) 
Dr. Deneal Smith (2021–2022) 
Andrew M. Wright BSc (2022–Present)

Coat of arms

The arms of Bablake School are those of its benefactor, Thomas Wheatley: Sanguine a Lion Rampant Argent, on a Chief Or, Three Mullets of the second.

Layout

The Bablake site houses two schools: a junior school that takes children between year 3 and year 6, and a senior school that takes children between year 7 and sixth form.  Although the junior school is formally independent, its intake generally move up as a group to the senior school. In the main school, there are blocks allocated to specific subjects, such as science,  music, drama and English combined, and a languages block. The main school building contains rooms for history, geography, computer science,  art, design & technology and maths. The school has a swimming pool and indoor sporting facilities on site including an indoor artificial climbing wall and fully equipped gym. It also has four tennis courts, which are used as netball courts at other times in the year. Off site there are six rugby pitches, hockey astroturf (with floodlights) and three cricket squares. The cricket pavilion, which housed the changing rooms, was hit by lightning on 28 June 2005, and was out of use until spring 2006. In the EDM – English/Drama/Music block – there is a large theatre and a rehearsal room which are both used for plays and music recitals.

Houses

Notable former pupils

Former students, known as "Old Wheatleyans", include:

Kare Adenegan (born 2000), won 2018 BBC Young Sports Personality of the Year
Mark Best (born 1994), cricketer for Loughborough MCCU
Paul Best (born 1991), cricketer for Warwickshire
Olivia Broadfield (born 1981), singer-songwriter
Robert Clift (born 1962), hockey player, Olympic gold medallist
Norman Coke-Jephcott (1893–1962), composer and organist
Martine Croxall (born 1969), BBC News presenter
Fred Daniels (1892–1959), stills photographer
Sir John Egan, (born 1939), Executive, Deputy Lieutenant of the County of Warwickshire
Geoff Evans (rugby union, born 1950) England and British Lions Rugby Player
Tony Fairbrother (1926–2004), aeronautical engineer, flight test engineering on the maiden flight of the de Havilland Comet, the first jet airliner
Shane Geraghty (born 1986), rugby union player
Courtenay Griffiths QC, criminal barrister
Kenneth Hegan OBE (1901–1989), England international footballer
Melissa Kite (born 1972), journalist
Leonard Lord, 1st Baron Lambury KBE (1896–1967), industrialist
Tony Mottram (born 1920), tennis player, former British number 1
Brian Matthew (1928–2017), broadcaster
Simon Over (born 1964), pianist and conductor
Jack Parsons (1890–1981), cricketer
Angus Russell (born 1956), businessman, former CEO of Shire plc
Sir James Shelley (1884–1961), educationalist, critic and broadcaster
Nick Skelton (born 1957), showjumper, Olympic gold medallist
Donald Trelford (1937–2023), former editor of The Observer
Melissa Walton (born 1990), Hollyoaks actress, as Loretta Jones

Appearances in the media
Part of the 2009 Christmas film Nativity! was filmed at the school.

The first three episodes of the 2019 BBC Two series Back in Time for School, covering the period from 1895 to 1959, were filmed at the school.

See also
Grade I listed buildings in Coventry

References

Further reading
 Peter Burden, The Lion and the Stars: A History of Bablake School, Coventry (Coventry: Coventry School Foundation, 1990)

External links

 Official Homepage
 Coventry School Foundation

 
Private schools in Coventry
Educational institutions established in the 14th century
1344 establishments in England
Member schools of the Headmasters' and Headmistresses' Conference
Grade I listed buildings in the West Midlands (county)